Berwick is a town in St. Mary Parish, Louisiana, United States. The population was 4,946 at the 2010 census. It is part of the Morgan City Micropolitan Statistical Area.

Jenny Craig, weight loss guru and founder of Jenny Craig, Inc., is originally from Berwick.

History 
The first white settler to trek through the wilderness in this area was Thomas Berwick. He settled along the banks of the Atchafalaya River in the late 18th century. Today the town of Berwick is home to several seafood processing plants and numerous boat companies.

Geography 

The Berwick area  is known for its high academic standards and high performing bands. Berwick High School ranked as the seventh best public high school in Louisiana for the 2006-2007 school year.

Demographics

2020 census

As of the 2020 United States census, there were 4,771 people, 1,665 households, and 1,016 families residing in the town.

2000 census
As of the census of 2000, there were 4,418 people, 1,655 households, and 1,193 families residing in the town. The racial makeup of the town was 86.65% White, 8.26% African American, 0.70% Native American, 0.72% Asian, 0.54% from other races, and 3.12% from two or more races. Hispanic or Latino of any race were 1.45% of the population.

There were 1,655 households, out of which 40.4% had children under the age of 18 living with them, 53.7% were married couples living together, 12.7% had a female householder with no husband present, and 27.9% were non-families. 23.4% of all households were made up of individuals, and 8.9% had someone living alone who was 65 years of age or older. The average household size was 2.67 and the average family size was 3.15.

In the town, the population was spread out, with 29.7% under the age of 18, 8.8% from 18 to 24, 30.9% from 25 to 44, 21.1% from 45 to 64, and 9.4% who were 65 years of age or older. The median age was 34 years. For every 100 females, there were 93.9 males. For every 100 females age 18 and over, there were 93.5 males.

The median income for a household in the town was $33,208, and the median income for a family was $40,297. Males had a median income of $33,413 versus $21,620 for females. The per capita income for the town was $15,099. About 12.1% of families and 14.8% of the population were below the poverty line, including 15.8% of those under age 18 and 18.6% of those age 65 or over.

Education
St. Mary Parish School Board operates public schools:
 Berwick High School
 Berwick Junior High School
 Berwick Elementary School

References

External links

 Town of Berwick official website

Towns in Louisiana
Towns in St. Mary Parish, Louisiana